Glendale is an unincorporated community and a census-designated place (CDP) located in and governed by Boulder County, Colorado, United States. The CDP is a part of the Boulder, CO Metropolitan Statistical Area. The population of the Glendale CDP was 69 at the United States Census 2010. The Jamestown post office (Zip Code 80455) serves the area.

Geography
Glendale is located in central Boulder County in the Front Range of the Colorado Rocky Mountains, in the valley of Left Hand Creek. Lefthand Canyon Drive leads east  to Altona and U.S. Highway 36, and west  to Ward and State Highway 72.

Demographics

See also

Outline of Colorado
Index of Colorado-related articles
State of Colorado
Colorado cities and towns
Colorado census designated places
Colorado counties
Boulder County, Colorado
Colorado metropolitan areas
Front Range Urban Corridor
North Central Colorado Urban Area
Denver-Aurora-Boulder, CO Combined Statistical Area
Boulder, CO Metropolitan Statistical Area

References

External links

Boulder County website

Census-designated places in Boulder County, Colorado
Census-designated places in Colorado
Denver metropolitan area